Bad Leonfelden is a municipality in the district of Urfahr-Umgebung in the Austrian state of Upper Austria. Steven Beller, author of A Concise History of Austria, who has family links to Bad Leonfelden, cites episodes from the town's history from its foundation in 1292 to the 21st century, to demonstrate the impact of historical and political events on the local life in Austria's rural provinces. The Jugendstil mosaicist Leopold Forstner was born there.

Geography
The Weigetschlag/Studánky border crossing leads to the town of Vyšší Brod,  to the north in the Czech Republic.

The highest elevation is on the eastern slope of the Sternstein at around 970 m above sea level near the village of Oberstern and the lowest point at around 675 m above sea level near the border to the village of Schönau in the municipality of Zwettl an der Rodl. The centre of Bad Leonfelden is 750  m above sea level.

Bad Leonfelden stands on the Granite and Gneiss Plateau, the Austrian part of the Bohemian Massif.

Population

References

Cities and towns in Urfahr-Umgebung District
Spa towns in Austria